The Manitou Islands are a series of small islands in Lake Nipissing, in Nipissing District, Ontario, Canada.

History
Samuel de Champlain visited the islands in 1613 and called them "pretty". Fur traders found the island a handy resting spot, and often would camp overnight. Today the islands' sand beaches continue to be a popular resting and recreation spot for many boaters.

Lime was quarried on the islands in the 1880s when the Canadian Pacific Railway was built, and a lime kiln was operated to create lime for mortar. Great Manitou Island, the largest of the islands, once held a dance hall and hotel, but it burned to the ground. Uranium mining was conducted on Newman Island in the 1950s.

Local legend says that the island is haunted by the Nipissing people who died of starvation after battling the Iroquois and being forced to flee the islands.

Until 1981, the entire Great Manitou Island was privately owned. In 1982, most of it was donated to the government through the efforts of the Nature Conservancy of Canada and the Ontario Heritage Foundation. Over the following years, other individual private lots have been purchased by the government.

Geography

The five islands are:
Great Manitou Island 
Little Manitou Island 
Calder Island 
Rankin Island 
Newman Island

Geology
The Manitou Islands lie inside the Ottawa-Bonnechere Graben and are part of an eroded volcanic pipe, leaving the multiple islands. The volcanic pipe formed by the violent, supersonic eruption of a deep-origin volcano. These volcanoes originate at least three times as deep as most other volcanoes, and the resulting magma that is pushed toward the surface is high in magnesium and volatile compounds such as water and carbon dioxide.  As the body of magma rises toward the surface, the volatile compounds transform to gaseous phase as pressure is reduced with decreasing depth.  This sudden expansion propels the magma upward at rapid speeds, resulting in a shallow supersonic eruption.

The Manitou Islands contain the uncommon rock types of fenite and syenite. Minerals found associated with these rocks include: pyroxenites, amphibole, apatite, biotite, calcite, magnetite, monazite, nepheline, pyrite, pyrochlore, pyroxene and quartz.

The nearby Callander Bay is also a volcanic pipe.

Provincial park

The Manitou Islands Provincial Nature Reserve protects 4 of the 5 islands (as a private island, Calder Island is excluded), and also has a 1-kilometer-wide zone around the islands that protects the submarine lakebeds. It was established in 1989 and is representative of island ecology in Lake Nipissing with warmer than normal regional temperatures. Permitted activities include swimming, boating, and nature viewing.

It is a non-operating park, meaning that there are no facilities or services. The park’s beaches are available for day use only.

Flora
Trees on the islands include basswood, ash, silver maple, white birch, white cedar, burr oak, and sugar maple.

Common vegetation include striped maple, chokecherry, Canada yew, stinging nettle, and poison ivy (which is prevalent in most vegetated areas).

See also
Volcanism of Canada
Volcanism of Eastern Canada
List of volcanoes in Canada
Callander Bay

References

Diatremes of Ontario
Proterozoic volcanoes
Lake islands of Ontario
Landforms of North Bay, Ontario
Lake Nipissing
Lime kilns in Canada
Quarries in Canada